Restormel was a borough of Cornwall, England, one of the six administrative divisions that made up the county. Its council was based in St Austell; its other towns included Newquay.

The borough was named after Restormel Castle. It was formed on 1 April 1974, under the Local Government Act 1972, by a merger of the borough of St. Austell with Fowey, Newquay urban district and St Austell Rural District. The name Restormel comes from Cornish, meaning the king's tower hill.

The motto of the borough, in Cornish, is Ro an mor hag an tyr, meaning "From the sea and from the land". It recognises the borough's connection with the sea (fishing and tourism) and the land (china clay and agriculture). St Austell, the largest settlement in Cornwall, does not have a Parish/Town Council.

The district was abolished as part of the 2009 structural changes to local government in England on 1 April 2009.

Twinning
Restormel is twinned by oath, which can be viewed in the council offices in St Austell, with Kreis Dithmarschen. This used to be part of the borough council; however, in recent years it has become a separate organisation.

Council investments
In March 2009, Restormel Borough Council was accused by spending watchdog the Audit Commission of "negligence" for putting money into Icelandic banks days before they went bust in October 2008.

See also
Restormel Borough Council elections

References

External links

 Official Twinning Website
 https://web.archive.org/web/20060214091224/http://www.restormel.gov.uk/
 Restormel Election Results 2007
 Restormel Arts
 Postcards of the Hundred of Powder
 Cornwall Record Office Online Catalogue for Restormel Borough/District Council

 
English districts abolished in 2009
Former non-metropolitan districts of Cornwall
Former boroughs in England